JDS Natsushio (SS-523) was the lead boat of the s. She was commissioned on 29 June 1963.

Construction and career
Natsushio was laid down at Mitsubishi Heavy Industries Kobe Shipyard on 5 December 1961 and launched on 18 September 1962. She was commissioned on 29 June 1963.

On 1 February 1965, the 1st Submarine was reorganized into the 1st Submarine Group, which was newly formed under the Self-Defense Fleet. Along the way, on 15 July, a periscope broke in a collision with an uninhabited cargo ship in the waters south of Oahu.

The submarine was removed from the naval register on 20 March 1978.

Citations

External links

1962 ships
Natsushio-class submarines
Ships built by Mitsubishi Heavy Industries